Maddox may refer to:

People
Maddox (given name)
Maddox (surname)
Maddox (writer) (born George Ouzounian in 1978), American writer of "The Best Page in the Universe"

Fiction
Brad Maddox, a professional wrestling alias
Jamie Madrox, fictional character in the Marvel Comics universe
Brooke Maddox, fictional character in the hit MTV show Scream
Maddox Fisk, fictional character in the Fablehaven novels by Brandon Mull

Places
Maddox, Maryland
Maddox, Tennessee

Other uses
Maddox Brothers and Rose, American band
USS Maddox (disambiguation)

See also
 Maddock (disambiguation)
Maddocks, a surname
Madoc (disambiguation)
Maddix (disambiguation)
Maddux (disambiguation)
Madox (given name)
Madoxx, stage name for Ugandan roots reggae musician David Amon Ssemanda Ssematimba